Kristina Rachel García (born 20 February 2003) is a Dominican footballer who plays as an attacking midfielder for Great Neck South High School and as a forward for the Dominican Republic national team.

College career 
García has verbally committed to the Stony Brook Seawolves to join them in 2021.

International career 
García has appeared for the Dominican Republic at the 2020 CONCACAF Women's Olympic Qualifying Championship qualification.

Personal life 
García was born in the United States to a Dominican mother and a Salvadoran father. Her father has played in the El Salvador national team.

References

External links 

2003 births
Living people
Citizens of the Dominican Republic through descent
Dominican Republic women's footballers
Women's association football midfielders
Women's association football wingers
Women's association football forwards
Dominican Republic women's international footballers
Dominican Republic people of Salvadoran descent
Sportspeople of Salvadoran descent
People from Great Neck, New York
Sportspeople from Nassau County, New York
Soccer players from New York (state)
American women's soccer players
American sportspeople of Salvadoran descent
African-American women's soccer players
American sportspeople of Dominican Republic descent
21st-century African-American sportspeople
21st-century African-American women